All Alone is a solo album by bassist Ron Carter recorded in 1988 and released on the EmArcy label.

Reception

The AllMusic review by Ron Wynn called it a "Nice showcase for Carter's impeccable bass skills".

Track listing 
All compositions by Ron Carter except where noted
 "D.B. Blues" – 7:36
 "New York Standard Time" – 6:18
 "Body and Soul" (Johnny Green, Edward Heyman, Frank Eyton, Robert Sour) – 8:12
 "Tap, Tap, Tap" – 9:09
 "The Same 12 Tones" – 5:50
 "Two Hands Only" – 7:46

Personnel 
Ron Carter - bass

References 

Ron Carter albums
1988 albums
EmArcy Records albums
Albums recorded at Van Gelder Studio